The 1998 ATP Tour World Championships (also known for the doubles event as the Phoenix ATP Tour World Doubles Championship for sponsorship reasons) was a tennis tournament played on indoor carpet courts. The surface was called "GreenSet On Wood" which had a wood base coated in synthetic material and provided a medium-pace surface. It was the 29th edition of the year-end singles championships, the 25th edition of the year-end doubles championships, and both were part of the 1998 ATP Tour. The singles event took place at the EXPO 2000 Tennis Dome in Hanover, Germany, from 24 November through 29 November 1998, and the doubles event at the Hartford Civic Center in Hartford, Connecticut, United States, from 18 November through 22 November 1998.

Champions

Singles

 Àlex Corretja defeated  Carlos Moyá, 3–6, 3–6, 7–5, 6–3, 7–5
It was Àlex Corretja's 5th title of the year, and his 9th overall. It was his 1st career year-end championships title.

Doubles

 Jacco Eltingh /  Paul Haarhuis defeated  Mark Knowles /  Daniel Nestor, 6–4, 6–2, 7–5

References

External links
Official website
Singles Finals Draw
Singles round robin draw (Red Group)
Singles round robin draw (White Group)
Doubles Finals Draw
Doubles round robin draw (Green Group)
Doubles round robin draw (Gold Group)

 
ATP Tour World Championships
1998
Tennis tournaments in Germany
Tennis tournaments in the United States
ATP Tour World Championships
ATP Tour World Championships
Sport in Hanover
Sports in Hartford, Connecticut
Sports competitions in Hartford, Connecticut
ATP Tour World Championships
ATP Tour World Championships
ATP Tour World Championships